Greenery Will Bloom Again is a 2014 Italian anti-war film written and directed by Ermanno Olmi. Set in the trenches of the Asiago plateau, during World War I, it is loosely based on the short story La paura (1921), by Federico De Roberto. It was screened in the Berlinale Special section at the 65th Berlin International Film Festival. The film received eight nominations at the 2015 David di Donatello Awards, including best film and best director. This is the last film to have been written and directed by Ermanno Olmi, before his death in 2018.

Cast 
 
Claudio Santamaria as The Major
 Alessandro Sperduti as The Lieutenant
 Francesco Formichetti as The Captain
 Andrea Di Maria as The Mule's Driver 
 Camillo Grassi as The Orderly
 Niccolò Senni as The Forgotten
 Domenico Benetti as The Sergeant
 Andrea Benetti as The Corporal
 Francesco Nardelli as Soldier Toni
 Niccolò Tredese as the delirious soldier

See also   
 List of Italian films of 2014

References

External links 

2014 films
2010s war films
Films directed by Ermanno Olmi
Italian war films
World War I films set on the Italian Front
Anti-war films about World War I
Films set in Italy
2010s Italian-language films
2010s Italian films